Lalawmpuia Ralte (born 24 October 1999)  is an Indian professional footballer who plays as a forward for I-League club Sudeva Delhi, on loan from Hyderabad.

Career
Born in Mizoram, Lalawmpuia joined Hyderabad on a three-year deal from Goa. On 11 December 2020, Lalawmpuia made his professional debut for Indian Super League side Hyderbad FC  against ATK Mohun Bagan.He came on as a 76th minute substitute for the Souvik Chakrabarti as Hyderbad FC drew the match 1–1.

On 28 July 2021, Lalawmpuia joined Sudeva Delhi on a season-long loan.

Career statistics

Club

References

External links
 Indian Super League profile
 

1999 births
Living people
People from Aizawl
Indian footballers
India youth international footballers
DSK Shivajians FC players
FC Goa players
Indian Super League players
Association football forwards
Footballers from Mizoram
I-League players
Sudeva Delhi FC players